Endotricha melanobasis is a species of snout moth in the genus Endotricha. It was described by George Hampson in 1916 and is known from northern India.

References

Moths described in 1916
Endotrichini